Rognaldsvåg is a fishing village in the municipality of Kinn in Vestland county, Norway. The small village has about 80 residents (as of 2012). The village has two ports with a distinctive channel between them where boathouses are close together. Rognaldsvåg is rich in ambience and cultural heritage with cemeteries and ruins from the Viking Age.

Local dialect

References

Kinn
Villages in Vestland